The Brotenaubach is a river in Baden-Württemberg, Germany. At its confluence with the Dürreych west of Bad Wildbad, the Eyach is formed.

See also
List of rivers of Baden-Württemberg

Rivers of Baden-Württemberg
Rivers of the Black Forest
Rivers of Germany